Qaleh-ye Mishvand (also Romanized as Qal‘eh-ye Mīshvand and Qal‘eh Mīshwand; also known as Mīshvand) is a village in Miyankuh-e Gharbi Rural District, in the Central District of Pol-e Dokhtar County, Lorestan Province, Iran. At the 2006 census, its population was 216, in 40 families.

References 

Towns and villages in Pol-e Dokhtar County